"The Mirror's Truth" is a song by Swedish heavy metal band In Flames from their ninth album, A Sense of Purpose. It was released as a single/EP on 7 March 2008.

The disc contains the title track and three songs that did not appear on the album, of which two are previously unreleased. The cover artwork  was created by Alex Pardee, who had designed the artwork for the whole A Sense of Purpose album. The music video was shot in an abandoned power plant in Scharins, Skellefteå, Sweden, and debuted on Myspace on 18 February 2008.

"The Mirror's Truth" is one of the songs chosen for the Madden NFL 09 video game soundtrack. It is also featured in another video game,  MX vs. ATV Reflex. The same version of "Abnegation" appeared on Viva La Bands, Volume 2.

Track listing

Charts

Personnel
 Anders Fridén – vocals
 Jesper Strömblad – guitar
 Björn Gelotte – guitar
 Peter Iwers – bass guitar
 Daniel Svensson – drums

References

External links
 The Mirror's Truth @ MusicBrainz
 Nuclear Blast
 Free samples

2008 singles
In Flames songs
2007 songs
Songs written by Jesper Strömblad
Nuclear Blast Records singles